Pierre Louis Auguste Ferron, Count de La Ferronnays (1777–1842) was French Minister of Foreign Affairs from 4 January 1828 to 24 April 1829.

Life
Born in Saint-Malo a few years after Chateaubriand, as he had himself participated in the campaign of the army of Émigrés in 1792, then emigrated to England where he joined the Duke du Berry.

At the Bourbon Restoration, he was appointed brigadier, and peer of France in 1815. 
He held several embassies before becoming foreign minister in the Martignac ministry in 1828, for a short tome. During these years he maintained a friendly correspondence with Chateaubriand, that he briefly mentions in his memoirs.

He had children:
 Charles, General Counsel of the Oise, the then deputy mayor of Gers and Boury-en-Vexin for 12 years, who married the Countess of Lagrange;
 Pauline (1808–1891), by her marriage Mrs. Augustus Craven, novelist;
 Eugenie, by marriage Countess Adrien de Mun, mother of the speaker Albert de Mun.

He bought the castle Boury-en-Vexin, in 1835.

1777 births
1842 deaths
Politicians from Saint-Malo
Counts of France
Legitimists
French Foreign Ministers
Members of the Chamber of Peers of the Bourbon Restoration
19th-century French diplomats